Kevin Rooney may refer to:
 Kevin Rooney (comedian)
 Kevin Rooney (boxer)
 Kevin Rooney (ice hockey)
 Kevin J. Rooney, American politician